Cruzeiro Esporte Clube , commonly known as Cruzeiro, is a Brazilian football club based in Itaporanga, Paraíba state. Its name is a tribute to Cruzeiro Esporte Clube.

Honours
 Campeonato Paraibano - 2nd division : 2007

References

  Cruzeiro de Itaporanga vai contar com 4 jogadores do Treze na 2ª divisão

Association football clubs established in 1969
Football clubs in Paraíba
1969 establishments in Brazil